The figure skating competition at the 2019 Southeast Asian Games in the Philippines was held from 29 November to 1 December 2019 at the SM Megamall Ice Rink.

Competition schedule
The following is the schedule for the figure skating competitions. All times are Philippine Standard Time (UTC+8).

Results

Men's singles

Ladies' singles

Medal summary

Medal table
Key

Medalists

References

External links
 

2019
Southeast Asian Games
2019 Southeast Asian Games events